Saengildo (literally translates to “birthday island”) is a South Korean island of 15 km² in the East China Sea on which the island's economy is based. The highest point is Baegunsan (483 m above sea level).

Yongchul pebble beach draws attention of the tourists.

Administration 
Yuseo-ri, Geumgok-ri, and Bongseon-ri, Saengil-myeon, Wando County, South Jeolla Province, South Korea

References

External links
Saengil Town Office 

Islands of South Jeolla Province
Wando County